Lucas Mauricio Acosta (born 12 March 1995) is an Argentine professional footballer who plays as a goalkeeper for Sarmiento, on loan from Lanús.

Career
Acosta started his career in 2013 with Primera División side Belgrano. He appeared on the bench for twelve games in two seasons, prior to making his professional debut in the Copa Sudamericana on 18 September against Lanús; an encounter Belgrano lost 5–1. He made his next appearance and league bow on 11 March 2017, a day before his 22nd birthday, in a defeat to San Lorenzo. Acosta had been selected forty-seven times by the end of 2017–18, though the goalkeeper didn't feature across 2018–19. In August 2019, Belgrano revealed a contractual dispute was ongoing with Acosta; as a deal with Colón was agreed, but Acosta rejected the move.

In July 2020, after continued issues with Belgrano that stopped him being selected, Acosta departed to Lanús following the expiration of his contract. On 27 January 2022, Acosta was loaned out to fellow league club Sarmiento until the end of the year. In a game against Unión de Santa Fe on 27 February 2022, Acosta suffered an anterior cruciate ligament injury, which was expected to keep him sidelines for 6-8 months.

Career statistics
.

References

External links
 

1995 births
Living people
Footballers from Córdoba, Argentina
Argentine footballers
Association football goalkeepers
Argentine Primera División players
Club Atlético Belgrano footballers
Club Atlético Lanús footballers
Club Atlético Sarmiento footballers